A list of British films released in 2009.

See also
 2009 in film
 2009 in British music
 2009 in British radio
 2009 in British television
 2009 in the United Kingdom
 List of 2009 box office number-one films in the United Kingdom

References

External links

2009
Films
Lists of 2009 films by country or language